Route 574, or Highway 574, may refer to:

Canada
Alberta Highway 574
 Ontario Highway 574
Township Road 574 (Saskatchewan)

Israel
 Israel road 574

Malaysia 
  Jalan Kampung Kuala

United Kingdom
 A574 road

United States
 Florida State Road 574
 Kentucky Route 574
 Louisiana Highway 574
Louisiana Highway 574-1
Louisiana Highway 574-3
Louisiana Highway 574-4
Louisiana Highway 574-5
Louisiana Highway 574-6
Louisiana Highway 574-7
Louisiana Highway 574-8
Louisiana Highway 574-9
Louisiana Highway 574-10
Louisiana Highway 574-11
Louisiana Highway 574-12
 Nevada State Route 574
 New Mexico State Road 574
 Ohio State Route 574
 Puerto Rico Highway 574
 South Carolina Highway 574 (former)
 Farm to Market Road 574
 Texas State Highway Loop 574
 County Road 574 (Hernando County, Florida)
 County Road 574 (Hillsborough County, Florida)
 County Route 574 (Erie County, New York)